The Stew of Life (Traditional Chinese: 有營煮婦) is a TVB family comedy series. It stars Louise Lee, Christine Ng, Chung King Fai and Fala Chen as the main leads.

Plot

Upon returning from a trip with her husband NG MAN TAK (Chung King Fai), cookery teacher LO SIU LAI (Lee Sze Kei, Louise) is shocked to find that her little daughter NG CHOI NI (Chen Fala) has started cohabiting with a homosexually inclined colleague LAU TAT YAN (Hung Tin Ming) while her divorced sister LO SIU MEI (Ng Wing Mei) is seemingly caught up in a love triangle between tenant YAU KAI (Mak Cheung Ching) and her ex-husband. By and by TAK is forced to retire early and stays at home all day with nothing to do. LAI, on the other hand, is lucky enough to have the opportunity to host a culinary show on TV. Everything seems to have happened too fast but this does not leave LAI frustrated and accursed. Instead she tries to get round every problem with even more patience and dedication, which however is not appreciated by TAK. The bickering continues until LAI eventually thinks of a good way to tackle TAK.

Cast

Ng Family

Yau Family

Other cast

Awards and nominations
TVB Anniversary Awards (2009)
 Best Drama
 Best Actress (Louise Lee)
 Best Supporting Actor (Mak Cheung-ching)
 Best Supporting Actress (Fala Chen)
 Best Supporting Actress (Christine Ng)
 My Favourite Female Character (Louise Lee)
 My Favourite Female Character (Fala Chen)
 My Favourite Female Character (Christine Ng)
 Most Improved Actor (Johnson Lee)

Viewership ratings

References

External links
TVB.com The Stew of Life - Official Website 

TVB dramas
2009 Hong Kong television series debuts
2009 Hong Kong television series endings